Piz Riein is a mountain of the Lepontine Alps, situated south-east of Ilanz in the canton of Graubünden. It lies on the range between the Val Lumnezia and Safiental, named Cadeina dil Signina.

References

External links
 Piz Riein on Hikr

Mountains of Graubünden
Mountains of the Alps
Lepontine Alps
Mountains of Switzerland
Ilanz/Glion